Daikon is a winter radish native to East Asia.

Daikon may also refer to:

 Japanese radish or true daikon, a Japanese root vegetable
 Daikon (system), a computer program that detects likely invariants of programs
 Daikon Island, Japan